National Party or Nationalist Party may refer to:

Active parties
 National Party of Australia
 Bangladesh:
 Bangladesh Nationalist Party
 Jatiya Party (Ershad) a.k.a. National Party (Ershad)
 California National Party 
 Nationalist Party of Canada
 Kuomintang or Chinese Nationalist Party, in Mainland China (1919–1949) and Taiwan (since 1949)
 National Party (Denmark)
 National Party (Ireland)
 National Party of Honduras
 Hong Kong National Party
 Homeland Party (Libya) or Libyan National Party
 Basotho National Party, in Lesotho
 Nationalist Party (Malta)
 Frisian National Party, in the Netherlands
 New Zealand National Party
 Pakistan:
 Awami National Party
 Balochistan National Party (Mengal)
 National Party (Pakistan)
 Kalat State National Party
 National Party (Papua New Guinea)
 Nacionalista Party, in the Philippines
 Plaid Genedlaethol Cymru or The National Party of Wales
 Samoa National Party
 Scottish National Party
 Seychelles National Party
 Slovak National Party
 Slovenian National Party
 National Party (Solomon Islands)
 National Party South Africa
 Basque Nationalist Party, in Spain
 National Party of Suriname
 Nationalist Movement Party, in Turkey
 British National Party
 National Party (Uruguay)
 Việt Nam Quốc Dân Đảng or Vietnamese Nationalist Party (founded 1927, in exile since 1975)
 National Party (Zambia)

Former parties
 Australia:
 Nationalist Party of Australia (1917–1931)
 National Party (South Australia) (1917–1923)
 National Party (Belize)
 Nationalist Party (Bolivia)
 Burma:
 Nationalist Party (Burma) (1920s)
 Nationalist Party (1930s)
 Canada:
 National Party of Canada
 National Party of Canada (1979)
 Parti National (Quebec)
 Parti nationaliste du Québec
 Chile:
 National Party (Chile, 1857) (1857–1933)
 National Party (Chile, 1966) (1966–94)
 National Party (Colombia)
 Czech Republic:
 National Party (1848-1918), known as Old Czech Party
 National Party (Czech Republic)
 Breton National Party, in France
 Liberal Party of Gibraltar (founded 1991 as Gibraltar National Party)
 Grenada:
 The National Party
 Grenada National Party
 Nationalist Party (Iceland)
 Ireland:
 Nationalist Party (Ireland)
 National Party (Ireland, 1924)
 Catholic Democrats (Ireland) (1995)
 Isle of Man:
 National Party (Isle of Man)
 Manx National Party (1977–1981)
 National Party (Japan)
 Malaysia:
 Sarawak National Party
 Parti Negara
 Nationalist Party (Peru)
 National Party (Poland)
 Puerto Rican Nationalist Party
 National Party (Romania)
 West Indies National Party, in Saint Vincent and the Grenadines
 Solomon Islands Liberal Party a.k.a. ''Nationalist Party
 South Africa:
 National Party (South Africa) (1914–1997)
 New National Party (South Africa) (1997–2005)
 National Party (Sweden)
 National Party (Syria)
 Thai Nation Party
 United Kingdom:
 British National Party (1960)
 Cornish Nationalist Party
 English National Party
 National Party (UK, 1917)
 National Party (UK, 1976)
 Nationalist Party (Northern Ireland)
 National Party of Scotland
 National Party of Europe
 Vectis National Party
 National Party (United States)

See also

 Nation Party (disambiguation)
 Nationalist Party (disambiguation)
 National Front (disambiguation) and National Front Party (disambiguation)
 New National Party (disambiguation)
 Democratic National Party (disambiguation)
 Independent National Party (disambiguation)
 National Action Party (disambiguation)
 National Democratic Party (disambiguation)
 National Labour Party (disambiguation)
 National Liberal Party (disambiguation)
 National People's Party (disambiguation)
 National Popular Party (disambiguation)
 National Progressive Party (disambiguation)
 National Unity Party (disambiguation)
 National Workers Party (disambiguation)
 Peoples National Party (disambiguation)
 People's Party (disambiguation)